Vysokovo-2 is a rural locality (a village) in Novlenskoye Rural Settlement, Vologodsky District, Vologda Oblast, Russia. The population was 11 as of 2002.

Geography 
Vysokovo-2 is located 78 km northwest of Vologda (the district's administrative centre) by road. Natsepino is the nearest rural locality.

References 

Rural localities in Vologodsky District